Saint-Georges-de-Didonne is a commune in the Charente-Maritime department and Nouvelle-Aquitaine region in southwestern France.

An important seaside resort of Royan and the coast of Beauty, on the right bank of the mouth of the Gironde estuary and adjacent Atlantic Ocean, Saint-Georges-de-Didonne is a major economic and tourist centers of royannaise metropolitan city which it is now becoming a residential suburb. It has a population of 5,342 inhabitants (2019) - to over 50,000 people during the summer season - and is part of the agglomeration community of Royan Atlantique with 83,661 inhabitants (2019).

Population

Notable people 

 Jean-Michel Coulon, Abstract painter
 Colette Besson, Athlete
 Jean-Paul Gonzalez, Virologist

See also
Communes of the Charente-Maritime department

References

Communes of Charente-Maritime
Charente-Maritime communes articles needing translation from French Wikipedia
Populated coastal places in France